Defending champion Roger Federer defeated Ivan Ljubičić in the final, 7–6(7–5), 7–6(7–4), 7–6(8–6) to win the men's singles tennis title at the 2006 Miami Open. With the win, Federer achieved his second Sunshine Double (following 2005).

Seeds
All seeded players receive a bye into the second round.

Draw

Finals

Top half

Section 1

Section 2

Section 3

Section 4

Bottom half

Section 5

Section 6

Section 7

Section 8

External links
 Men's singles draw
 Men's qualifying draw

2006 NASDAQ-100 Open
NASDAQ-100 Open